Jung Soo-Jong  (Hangul: 정수종; born 1 May 1987) is a South Korean footballer who plays as a forward.

Jung started his professional career in Jeonbuk Hyundai. After moving to Chungju Hummel in 2010. On 20 August 2010, he joined for Mokpo City FC, with Hong Deok-Jong.

References

External links
National League official website 

South Korean footballers
Jeonbuk Hyundai Motors players
K League 1 players
Korea National League players
1987 births
Living people
Association football defenders
Association football forwards